TransJakarta Corridor 6 is the TransJakarta Bus rapid transit corridor that operates from the Ragunan to the Dukuh Atas 2 BRT Station. The streets that Corridor 6 passes are Jl. Harsono RM, Jl. Taman Margasatwa, Jl. Warung Jati Barat, Jl. Mampang Prapatan, Jl. HR Rasuna Said, Jl. Kendal, Jl. Laturharhari, Jl. Sultan Agung, Jl. Setiabudi Barat, Jl. Setiabudi Tengah. The Dukuh Atas 2 station is the only Transjakarta bus stop in corridor 6 which is integrated with the KRL Commuterline Train at the Sudirman railway station. Most users of this corridor are passengers who want to go to Pasar Minggu, Pasar Minggu Baru, Duren Kalibata, Tanjung Barat, Lenteng Agung, Pancasila University, University of Indonesia, and Pondok Cina regions. KRL Commuterline users originating from stations along the Maja–Tanah Abang, Tangerang–Duri route as well as passengers originating from the Bekasi and Depok/Bogor lines who wish to travel to Ragunan can get off at Sudirman Station, and continue their journey with this corridor from the Dukuh Atas 2 bus station. In the future, this corridor will also be integrated with the Jabodebek LRT, starting from the Dukuh Atas 2 BRT Station, up to the Departemen Kesehatan BRT Station.

Corridor 6 began its trial run in December 2006 and inaugurated on January 27, 2007, along with corridor 4, 5, and 7.

From its early operational in 2007 until , Corridor 6 was considered to have poor service, due to of its not roadworthy bus fleets, lackness of park and ride services, lackness of facilities on BRT Stations, and unsterilized bus lanes from personal vehicles. Since then, TransJakarta has made a lot of major and minor improvements, so it's no longer considered to have poor service currently.

List of BRT Stations 
 Stations indicated by a -> sign has a one way service towards Dukuh Atas 2 only.
 During the Dukuh Atas LRT station construction, the corridor temporarily terminates at Halimun.
 Italic text indicates that the BRT Station is temporarily closed for renovation or the bus do not stop at the station.
 Currently, all bus stops are served by buses 24 hours a day. Night corridor M6 extends the line to Monas following corridor 6A/1's route.

Cross-Corridor Routes

Corridor 6A (Ragunan–M.H. Thamrin via Kuningan) 
 Only operates at weekdays (Monday-Friday) and closed on public holidays.
 Until February 28, 2023, this corridor serves the route from Ragunan to the Monas BRT station via Kuningan (Jalan H.R. Rasuna Said). On March 1, 2023, corridor 6A and 6B has been officially shortened to the M.H. Thamrin BRT station.

Corridor 6B (Ragunan–M.H. Thamrin via Semanggi) 
 Station indicated by a -> sign has a one way service towards M.H. Thamrin only.
 Italic text indicates that the BRT Station is temporarily closed for renovation or the bus do not stop at the station.
 *) Semanggi to Bendungan Hilir bus stop via skywalk bridge which is maybe too steep for disabled person and takes at least 10 minutes walk.
 Until February 28, 2023, this corridor serves the route from Ragunan to the Monas BRT station via the Semanggi Interchange (which means the route passes Jalan Jenderal Gatot Subroto and Jalan Jenderal Sudirman). On March 1, 2023, corridor 6B and 6A has been officially shortened to the M.H. Thamrin BRT station.

Corridor L6B (Ragunan – GBK via Corridor 13) 
 Only operates at weekdays (Monday-Friday) and closed on public holidays.
 Stations indicated by a <- sign has a one way service towards Ragunan only.

Corridor 6V (Ragunan–Gelora Bung Karno) 
 Stations indicated by a <- sign has a one way service towards Ragunan only. Stations indicated by a -> sign has a one way service towards Gelora Bung Karno only.

Fleets 
 Hino RK8 R260, blue BMP, Night bus (22:00 - 05:00) (Ragunan-Harmoni (via Rasuna Said, Thamrin)))
 Mercedes-Benz OH 1626 NG A/T, white-blue (MYS)
 Mercedes-Benz OH 1626 NG A/T, light blue-red (MYS), MYS Vintage Series)
 Scania K310IB 6x2, white-blue (MYS)
 Volvo B11R 6×2 A/T, white-blue (SAF)
 Zhongtong Bus LCK6180GC Euro 5, white-dark blue (PPD, only operates at corridor 6B)
 Mercedes-Benz OH 1626 L A/T, white-blue (BMP)

Depots 
 Cijantung (Mayasari Bakti)
 Cawang (PPD)
 Klender (SAF)

See also

TransJakarta
List of TransJakarta corridors

References

External links 
 

Bus routes
TransJakarta
Bus rapid transit in Indonesia